Lester Cotton Sr. (born February 20, 1996) is an American football offensive guard for the Miami Dolphins of the National Football League (NFL). He was signed as an undrafted free agent following the 2019 NFL Draft by the Las Vegas Raiders. He played college football at Alabama.

Early life 
Lester Cotton was born on February 20, 1996, in Tuscaloosa, Alabama.

High school 
He went to high school at Central High School in Tuscaloosa, Alabama. He was a four-star prospect and played in the 2015 Under Armour All-America game. He also was named the no. 3 offensive guard nationally by Rivals.com.

Awards and honors 
 Nike's 2014 "The Opening"
 2015 Parade All-America team
 2015 Under Armour All-America Game
 Medium School All-American by MaxPreps.com
 No. 3 offensive guard nationally by Rivals.com
 No. 46 in Rivals100
 No. 2 player in the state of Alabama by Rivals.com
 No. 59 in the Top247, the No. 4 offensive guard and No. 3 player in the state
 No. 54 in the 247Composite and the No. 4 guard
 Rated by Scout.com as the third-best offensive guard and the No. 66 player in the Scout300
 No. 100 in the ESPN300, the No. 7 guard, No. 5 player in Alabama and No. 51 in the Southeast region
 No. 59 on the Prepstar Top 150 Dream Team
 2014 AL.com Super All-State
 No. 3 on the final AL.com A-List
 First-team 5A All-State by the Alabama Sports Writers Association
 ASWA 5A Lineman of the Year
 2014 Alabama-Mississippi All-Star Game

College career 
Cotton chose Alabama over scholarship offers from Auburn, USC, Mississippi State and Ole Miss.

2015 
He played in four games in his first season.

2016 
He started the Crimson Tide's first two games of the season at left guard and started three games more games while playing right guard. He also played in nine other games. He was a blocker for nine 100-yard rushing games. Against USC he played 59 snaps at left guard with and had one knockdown block. He did not allow a pressure or a sack against them as he opened holes for 242 rushing yards.  Against Kent State he came off the bench to play 25 snaps and helped the Tide rush for 285 yards. When they played the Tennessee Volunteers Cotton started at right guard and helped cleared a path for 409 yards rushing and 594 yards of offense. Versus Texas A&M he recorded six knockdown blocks and opened holes for 287 yards on the ground and 451 yards of total offense. He played 12 games in 2016.

2017 
Cotton established a starting role at right guard as a junior in 2017 and started 13 games. Against Florida State Cotton helped make holes for 173 rushing yards in a 24–7 win over the No. 3 ranked Seminoles. When the Tide played Fresno State he had one knockdown block in 44 snaps in a win over the Bulldogs. He did not commit any penalties in the game. The Tide had 305 rushing yards in the win. He recorded two knockdown blocks while he helped open holes for 239 rushing yards and 487 total yards against Colorado State. When they played Vanderbilt, Cotton helped clear a path for 496 rushing yards and 677 total yards. He was graded out at 88 percent with six knockdown blocks. He started and played 55 snaps as the Crimson Tide beat the Ole Miss Rebels 66–3. Cotton played all 69 snaps on offense when they played Texas A&M. He blocked for his 6th 100-yard rushing game against Arkansas.  Cotton did not allow a sack or pressure in a 45–7 win against  Tennessee. Cotton made his ninth consecutive start vs.LSU. He was graded out at 89 percent on 34 snaps in a 56–0 win over Mercer. He did not allow a sack, pressure or hurry in the game. They had 530 yards of total offense, split evenly with 265 both in passing and rushing. Against Clemson he played 57 snaps in the Tide's 24–6 win in the Sugar Bowl before a knee injury forced him out of the game. He was graded out at 85 percent. He missed the CFP National Championship against Georgia because of an injury. He was a finalist for the Joe Moore award.

2018 
In 2018 he moved to left guard after playing right guard in the past. He made his first start as left guard against Louisville.  Cotton played 70 snaps against Arkansas State. He did not allow a sack and had three knockdown blocks against Ole Miss. He had two knockdown blocks against Texas A&M. Against Louisiana he played 42 snaps and had two knockdown blocks. He also did not allow a sack, pressure or commit a penalty. The Tide had a season high 639 yards against Arkansas. He played 53 snaps after coming off the bench against Mississippi State. Cotton came off the bench in relief of Deonte Brown to play 39 snaps in the SEC Championship Game. He returned to the starting lineup against Oklahoma and provided time for 528 yards of total offense. He finished his career with 28 starts. The Tide's offensive line only allowed an average of 1 sack per game in 2018.

Professional career

Las Vegas Raiders 
Cotton was signed as a undrafted free agent after the 2019 NFL Draft. He was released at roster cuts but was later signed to the practice squad. In December he was promoted to the active roster and played one snap in one game. He was active for 3 games but only played in one. He was released at roster cuts in 2020. In February 2021, he was signed again.

On August 31, 2021, Cotton was waived by the Raiders and re-signed to the practice squad the next day. After the Raiders were eliminated in the 2021 Wild Card round of the playoffs, he signed a reserve/future contract on January 17, 2022.

Cotton made the Raiders final roster in 2022 as a backup interior lineman. He made his first career start at right guard in Week 2 in a spot start. On December 3, 2022, Cotton was placed on injured reserve. He was released on December 15.

Miami Dolphins
On December 20, 2022, Cotton was signed to the Miami Dolphins practice squad. He signed a reserve/future contract on January 16, 2023.

References

External links
Alabama football recruit Lester Cotton: A day in the life of the Central-Tuscaloosa star
Alabama OL commit Lester Cotton had how many pancake blocks this season?
A-List No. 1, Alabama commit Lester Cotton continues to dominate for playoff-bound Central-Tuscaloosa

1996 births
Living people
American football offensive linemen
Alabama Crimson Tide football players
Las Vegas Raiders players
Miami Dolphins players